Kafkonia (Greek: Καυκωνία) is a small village in the municipality of Ancient Olympia, Elis, Greece. It is located between the villages Pelopio and Chelidoni, 5 km north of Olympia. It is about 200m above sea level.

References 

Populated places in Elis